The 1985 Omloop Het Volk was the 40th edition of the Omloop Het Volk cycle race and was held on 2 March 1985. The race started and finished in Sint-Amandsberg. The race was won by Eddy Planckaert.

General classification

References

1985
Omloop Het Nieuwsblad
Omloop Het Nieuwsblad
March 1985 sports events in Europe
1985 Super Prestige Pernod International